The women's heavyweight is a competition featured at the 2022 World Taekwondo Championships, and was held at the Acuático Code Metropolitano in Guadalajara, Mexico on 17 November 2022. Heavyweights were limited to a minimum of 73 kilograms in body mass.

Results
Legend
DQ — Won by disqualification
W — Won by withdrawal

Final

Top half

Bottom half

References

External links
Draw

Women's 74
2022 in women's taekwondo